"Hot (I Need To Be Loved, Loved, Loved, Loved)" is a funk song by James Brown. Released as a single in December 1975, it reached #31 on the R&B chart. It uses the main riff from the David Bowie song "Fame", released earlier the same year. Guitarist Carlos Alomar, who created the borrowed riff and was a co-writer on "Fame", was briefly in Brown's band in the late 1960s. Alomar said, "[Bowie] was extremely flattered that James Brown would take one of his songs."  The song also appeared as the lead track on Brown's 1976 album Hot.

References

External links
 AllMusic review

James Brown songs
Songs written by James Brown
1975 singles
1975 songs
Polydor Records singles